Taygetis ypthima is a species of butterfly of the family Nymphalidae. It is found in northeastern, southeastern and southern Brazil, Paraguay and Argentina at altitudes ranging from sea level to 2,000 metres.

Adults have been recorded year round.

References

Butterflies described in 1821
Euptychiina
Fauna of Brazil
Nymphalidae of South America